The streak-headed white-eye (Heleia squamiceps), also known as the streaky-headed white-eye or streak-headed ibon, is a species of bird in the family Zosteropidae. It is endemic to Sulawesi, Indonesia. Its natural habitat is subtropical or tropical moist montane forest.

References

Birds described in 1896
Endemic birds of Sulawesi
Heleia
Taxonomy articles created by Polbot